The Battle of Mečkin Kamen also known as 'Battle of Mechkin Kamen' (Bulgarian: Битка при Мечкин Камен, Macedonian: Битка кај Мечкин Камен) occurred on the hill now known as Mečkin Kamen ("Bear's Stone"), a few kilometres south from the town of Kruševo on 12 August 1903. It was part of the Ilinden-Preobrazhenie Uprising, led by the Internal Macedonian-Adrianople Revolutionary Organisation (IMARO or VMARO) against the Ottoman Empire. The leading revolutionary commanders of the local Kruševo Republic were Nikola Karev and Pitu Guli. The battle is an important event that is celebrated in Bulgaria and North Macedonia.

Before the battle, Pitu Guli inspected his forces and found out that 70 out of the 300 men part of his unit did not have any weapons so he let them return home. Following the takeover, and subsequent declaration of the Krusevo Republic, the surrounding areas were besieged by the Ottoman forces for an estimated 10 days, with the forces of the Macedonian Bulgarians and Aromanians being outnumbered and overrun. Following the Battle of Sliva and Mečkin Kamen, large parts of the Aromanian areas and villages were destroyed while 'the Bulgarian quarter' was mostly spared. Revolutionary Pitu Guli and most of his men were killed at the battle of Mečkin Kamen while Nikola Karev managed to break through the Turkish lines and escaped back to Bulgaria. The Turkish forces entered the town of Kruševo on the 12th August 1903.

A monument exists today on Mečkin Kamen where Pitu Guli was killed. There is a World War II memorial by Dimo Todorovski at the same site.

References

Sources
 MI-AN Publishing, Skopje 1998, Macedonia Yesterday And Today.

Kruševo Republic
Ottoman Kruševo
Internal Macedonian Revolutionary Organization
1903 in the Ottoman Empire
Meckin Kamen
Military history of North Macedonia
Kruševo Municipality
August 1903 events